Leroy Cudjoe (born 7 April 1988) is an English professional rugby league footballer who plays as a  for the Huddersfield Giants in the Betfred Super League. A product of the Huddersfield academy system, he also captained Huddersfield as well as representing England, he has played his whole Super League career to date with Huddersfield, playing as a er and  earlier in his career.

Early life
Cudjoe was born in Huddersfield, West Yorkshire, England and is of Grenadian descent, where his father's family originated.

Leroy attended Newsome High School and Sports College where he was known as the egg. Leroy's previous club is the Newsome Panthers.

Leroy is a product of the Giants' academy system

Domestic career

Huddersfield Giants
Cudjoe joined Huddersfield's Academy aged 16 and was awarded a full-time contract at the end of the 2006 season.  His 2007 season was partly disrupted due to a broken hand sustained in May, and he did not make a first team appearance although won the Huddersfield Reserves Player of the Year award at the end of the season.
He made his Super League début in Round 1 of 2008 against Leeds. He scored his first competitive try for the club in the 50–16 victory over Hull Kingston Rovers in May 2008.
He continued to be a favourite during the 2011 and 2012 seasons at his hometown club Huddersfield.

In the 2013 Super League season, he played 29 games as Huddersfield claimed the League Leaders Shield for the first time in 81 years.  Huddersfield would ultimately fall short of a grand final appearance that year.
After 10 years with the club, Cudjoe was given a Testimonial in 2018 by Huddersfield.
In round 15 of the 2021 Super League season, he played his 300th match for Huddersfield and scored a try in the club's 40-26 victory over Hull F.C.
On 28 May 2022, Cudjoe played for Huddersfield in their 2022 Challenge Cup Final loss against Wigan.

Representative career

Yorkshire
He was selected to play for Yorkshire Academy in the fixture against Lancashire Academy in the 2005 season.

England Academy
This fixture is often seen as a trial game for the full England Academy team and although he initially made the England training squad, Leroy missed out on a place in the final England squad.

England
He played his first match for England in the 2010 Four Nations tournament.

He played for England in the 2013 Rugby League World Cup.

References

External links
Huddersfield Giants profile
Cudjoe out for month with break, Huddersfield Examiner 11 May 2007
SL profile

1988 births
Living people
Black British sportspeople
England national rugby league team players
English sportspeople of Grenadian descent
English rugby league players
Huddersfield Giants players
Rugby league centres
Rugby league fullbacks
Rugby league players from Huddersfield
Rugby league wingers